Joseph Allen Baker (10 April 1852 – 3 July 1918) was a Canadian-born British engineer, specialising in machinery for the confectionery and bakery industries and later in transportation systems, who was also a Liberal Party politician in London.

Family and education
Joseph Allen Baker was born at Maple Ridge Farm in Trenton, Ontario the son of Joseph Baker, an engineer.  The Baker family were Quakers by religion.  Baker was educated at Trenton High School. In 1878 he married Elizabeth Moscrip of Morebattle, Kelso, Roxburghshire. They had three sons and four daughters, including the politician Philip Noel-Baker.

Career
Baker followed his father's professional footsteps and entered the family engineering business. He left Canada for London in 1878 and established a firm, Baker & Sons, with his brothers, of which he became chairman in 1892 on the death of his father. In 1879 they set up business in Finsbury but the trade expanded and, in 1890 a move was made to a large, newly built engineering works in Hythe Road, Willesden, where it remained for the next 43 years. As Quakers, the Baker family tried to run a model business taking a paternal interest in the welfare of their workforce and introducing schemes such as shorter working days, encouraging employees to participate in health and insurance plans and fostering a relaxed approach on the shop floor, perhaps to the detriment of profits. The company had interests in Britain, Canada, Australia and the USA.

Baker was prominently connected with the tramways in London and the extension of the tramway system in the London County Council area. He published special reports on tramway traction and recommended the conduit system for London. Baker and Sons also had connections to the motor car industry and in around 1902, the company held an agency for the American car manufacturers Stevens-Duryea. They later designed and built their own lorry for deliveries to the London docks. Baker & Sons merged with Perkins Engineers Ltd in 1919 to form Baker Perkins Ltd.

Politics

Baker represented Finsbury East on the London County Council (LCC) as a Progressive from 1895–1906. During his time on the LCC he acted as Chairman of the Highways Committee.

At the general election of 1900 Baker contested the East Finsbury constituency for the Liberal Party but could not unseat the sitting Unionist MP, Henry Charles Richards. 

Richards died in 1905 causing a by-election and Baker was selected to fight the division again. He won the by-election, which was held on 29 June 1905, with a majority of 768 votes 

He held his seat at each subsequent general election until his death.

Peace and religious work
As a Quaker, Baker was committed to peace and religious harmony. He initiated and organised an interchange of visits between representatives of the Christian churches of Great Britain and Germany in the interests of international peace and closer friendship. He was Chairman of the Executive Committee of the British Council of the Associated Councils of Churches in the British and German Empires for Fostering Friendly Relations and Chairman of the Executive Committee of the British Group of the World Alliance of Churches for Promoting International Friendship. He was also sometime President of the London Adult Schools' Union and was a strong supporter of temperance.

Death
Baker died in Westminster Hospital in the early hours of 3 July 1918,
aged 66, following a seizure in the House of Commons two days before. He was succeeded as Chairman of Baker and Sons by his eldest son, Allan R. Baker. His death caused a by-election in East Finsbury which was won for the Liberal Party by H.E.A.Cotton, who, like Baker was a former Progressive member of the LCC although he stood for election as a Government candidate.

References

External links 
 

1852 births
1918 deaths
Engineers from London
British Quakers
Members of London County Council
Liberal Party (UK) MPs for English constituencies
UK MPs 1900–1906
UK MPs 1906–1910
Politics of the London Borough of Islington
Progressive Party (London) politicians
Canadian Quakers
Canadian emigrants to the United Kingdom